Kainach is a river of Styria, Austria. It is a right tributary of the Mur in Wildon.

References 

Rivers of Styria
Rivers of Austria